Mohammed Al-Dossari (born 11 July 1999) is a Saudi Arabian professional footballer who plays as a right back for Al-Raed.

Career
Al-Dossari began his career at the youth team of Al-Hilal. He signed a one-year contract with the option to extend for a further on 3 August 2019. On 21 August 2019, Al-Dossari joined Saudi Professional League side Al-Raed on loan from Al-Hilal for the 2019–20 season.

References

External links
 

1999 births
Living people
Association football defenders
Saudi Arabian footballers
Saudi Professional League players
Al Hilal SFC players
Al-Raed FC players